Millers Falls Co. is a tool manufacturing company originally based in Millers Falls, Massachusetts.

It was established in Greenfield, Massachusetts in 1868 as Gunn & Amidon by Levi J. Gunn and Charles H. Amidon.  Gunn and  Amidon, along with a third partner, Henry L. Pratt built a factory in the north of Greenfield.  After the Greenfield factory burned down, the company was reorganized as the Millers Falls Manufacturing Co. It merged with Backus Vise Co. in 1872 to form Millers Falls Co..

In 1931 Millers Falls tools purchased the majority of the shares of Goodell-Pratt tools and merged with that manufacturer in 1932.

In 1962 the company was acquired by Ingersoll Rand.

In 1982, Ingersoll Rand sold the Millers Falls business to the newly created Millers Falls Tool Co.  The company was headquartered in Alpha, New Jersey.  Since 2002 the company trademark has belonged to Hangzhou Great Star Industrial, of Hangzhou, China.

Publications
 The catalogue, regularly published, with issues between 1883 and 1992 on record in libraries. , 
 A complete list in miniature of Russell's world renowned scroll saw designs., 1880. 
 A complete list in miniature of Wild's latest scroll saw designs, 1880. 
 A complete list in miniature of Bowman's famous scroll saw designs, 1880. 
 Tool practice : a treatise on the proper use and care of tools, containing information and advice of use to the mechanic, instructive and an inspiration to the apprentice, 1911. 
 You and your company, 1952. 
 Hand Tools, 1999.

References

External links
 A Millers Falls Home Page
 Old Wood Working Machines: Manufacturers Index: Millers Falls Co.
 The Curious Case of Millers Falls
 Rose Antique Tools: Millers Falls

Tool manufacturing companies of the United States
Companies based in Franklin County, Massachusetts
Manufacturing companies based in Massachusetts
Manufacturing companies established in 1868